Speiser v. Randall, 357 U.S. 513 (1958), was a U.S. Supreme Court case addressing the State of California's refusal to grant to ACLU lawyer Lawrence Speiser, a veteran of World War II, a tax exemption because that person refused to sign a loyalty oath as required by a California law enacted in 1954.  The court reversed a lower court ruling that the loyalty oath provision did not violate the appellants' First Amendment rights.

Facts
The State of California allowed a number of tax exemptions one of which was an exemption of property tax for veterans of World War II. Anyone desiring to claim the exemption was required to complete a standard form of application and submit the form with the local tax assessor.

In 1954, the form was revised to add a loyalty oath, which the applicant had to sign: "I do not advocate the overthrow of the Government of the United States or of the State of California by force or violence or other unlawful means, nor advocate the support of a foreign government against the United States in event of hostilities."

The appellants refused to sign the oath and contended the condition of requiring the oath to obtain a tax exemption was unconstitutional. The assessors denied the exemption solely because the appellants had refused to execute the oath by signature. The assessors based their reasoning on Article XX, 19, of the California Constitution, adopted in a general election in 1952, which includes language similar to the text of the loyalty oath.

Issue
Was the oath requirement a violation of the appellants' First Amendment rights and a violation of the due process clause of the Fourteenth Amendment?

Lower courts
The appellees argued that a tax exemption is a privilege and so its denial did not infringe on free speech.  The lower California courts did not agree and recognize that conditions imposed on privileges provided by the state had to be reasonable.

However, the Supreme Court of California construed the constitutional amendment to deny the tax exemption only to claimants who may be criminally punished under the California Criminal Syndicalism Act (California Statute 1919, c. 188) or the Federal Smith Act (18 U.S.C. 2385).

Decision
The US Supreme Court in its review asked a more basic question: with the loyalty oath, has California chosen a fair method to determine whether a tax exemption claimant is in fact someone to whom the criminal acts specified applies. In other words, though it is reasonable to deny a claimant a tax exemption if the claimant is involved in a criminal behavior, has the state arrived at a mechanism that demonstrates the criminal behavior?

The court ruled that because the state requires the claimant to show they are not advocating state overthrow and hence are not criminals within the applicable laws, the loyalty oath requirement to obtain the tax exemption is unconstitutional. The burden of proof for a criminal action rests on the state and not on the individual private citizen.  In other cases, the Supreme Court has upheld the constitutionality of loyalty oaths requirements but those involved public officials and not private citizens.

See also
 List of United States Supreme Court cases involving the First Amendment
 List of United States Supreme Court cases, volume 357

External links
 

1958 in United States case law
United States Free Speech Clause case law
United States Supreme Court cases
United States Supreme Court cases of the Warren Court
American Civil Liberties Union litigation